Dorothy N. Nichols Dolbey (April 28, 1908 – February 12, 1991) was an American politician who served as Mayor of Cincinnati for six months in 1954, and was the first woman to serve in this position.

Born in Cincinnati, Dolbey graduated from the University of Cincinnati and Columbia University with a degree in child psychology. After marrying James Dolbey 1935, she became a stay-at-home mother, raising two children, but also served as Cincinnati Council of Church Women United's president. In 1951, she first ran for city council, one of two women to do so, but failed to win a spot. Dolbey ran again in 1953, this time winning election to city council. Entering the next council term, the Charter Party had a 5-4 advantage over the Republican Party in council, and as such they were able to appoint the next mayor. Edward N. Waldvogel was named mayor while Dolbey was named vice-mayor.

Dolbey became the first woman in Major League Baseball history to throw out the Opening Day pitch in 1954, when the Cincinnati Reds had requested Waldvogel throw out the pitch. He was too ill to do so, so the honor was given to Dolbey. Waldvogel died a month later, and Dolbey became acting mayor until council could elect one, and she spent the next six months serving in that role. Council eventually re-appointed former mayor Carl West Rich to the position after 16 ballots; the previous 15 had been split between Rich, Dolbey, and a third nominee. Dolbey remained in city council until 1961, and retired from politics afterwards.

References

1908 births
1991 deaths
Cincinnati City Council members
Mayors of Cincinnati
Women mayors of places in Ohio
University of Cincinnati alumni
Women city councillors in Ohio
Columbia University alumni
20th-century American politicians
20th-century American women politicians